Adsbøl church (Danish: Adsbøl Kirke) is a 13th-century building in Adsbøl, Denmark.

Gallery

References 

13th-century churches in Denmark
Churches in the Region of Southern Denmark
Churches in the diocese of Haderslev